Selorm Kuadey (5 May 1987 – 3 January 2012) was a professional rugby union player who played for Sale Sharks as well as the England national under-20 rugby union team.

Kuadey graduated with a 1st class honours degree in human biology and infectious diseases at the University of Salford. Before joining Sale he had played for Lancashire at U15 and U16 and the North U18s.

Although he played for England Under-19s and England Under-20s, Ukraine-born Kuadey was never a first-team regular for Sale and injuries ended his chances of making progress in a rugby career. He was forced to retire after two very long term injuries in 2010, aged just 22, and had started a career outside rugby.

Sale Sharks announced his death, which was believed to be suicide, on 16 January 2012.

References

England Rugby Profile

Rugby union wings
People educated at Lancaster Royal Grammar School
Sale Sharks players
Alumni of the University of Salford
1987 births
2012 deaths